Le Belge was a 2-2-2 Patentee type steam locomotive with tender, built in 1835 by the company founded by John Cockerill in Seraing, Belgium. It was the first steam railway locomotive built in Belgium, and was built under license to a design by Robert Stephenson & Co.

Design and operation
The locomotive was built for the first main line on the European mainland, the Brussels-Mechelen line.

Replicas
A replica locomotive was built at the workshops of Boissellerie Cognaut for the 150th anniversary in 1980 of the formation of Belgium. Another replica was built in 1885 and is now displayed at Train World, the museum of the National Railways of Belgium, in Schaerbeek, Brussels.

See also
Adler (locomotive)

References

Further information

External links

Early steam locomotives
Steam locomotives of Belgium
Cockerill locomotives
Standard gauge locomotives of Belgium
2-2-2 locomotives